State insects are designated by 48 individual states of the fifty United States. Some states have more than one designated insect, or have multiple categories (e.g., state insect and state butterfly, etc.). Iowa and Michigan are the two states without a designated state insect.

More than half of the insects chosen are not native to North America, because of the inclusion of three European species (European honey bee, European mantis, and 7-spotted ladybird), each having been chosen by multiple states.

Table

See also
 Lists of United States state insignia

References

External links

state symbols
Insects
.US state symbols
Insects in culture